Thomas Bushnell "Bingo" Fullerton (June 20, 1890 – December 21, 1952) was an American football player and college football and college basketball coach. He served as the head football coach at Emory and Henry College in Abingdon, Virginia from 1915 to 1916 and from 1920 to 1926. He also served as the school's head men's basketball coach from 1921 to 1930.

References

External links
 

1890 births
1952 deaths
Basketball coaches from Illinois
Brevard Tornados football coaches
Emory and Henry Wasps football coaches
Emory and Henry Wasps men's basketball coaches
Illinois Fighting Illini football players
People from Ottawa, Illinois
Players of American football from Illinois